Becton, Dickinson and Company, also known as BD, is an American multinational medical technology company that manufactures and sells medical devices, instrument systems, and reagents. BD  also provides consulting and analytics services in certain geographies.

BD is ranked #177 in the 2021 Fortune 500 list based on its revenues for the fiscal year ending September 30, 2020.

In October 2014, the company agreed to acquire CareFusion for a price of US$12.2 billion in cash and stock.

History 
The company was founded in 1897 in New York City by Maxwell Becton and Fairleigh S. Dickinson. It later moved its headquarters to New Jersey.

Finances 
For the fiscal year 2017, Becton Dickinson reported earnings of US$1.030 billion, with an annual revenue of US$12.093 billion, an increase of 10.5% over the previous fiscal cycle. Becton Dickinson's shares traded at over US$192 per share, and its market capitalization was valued at over US$63 billion in November 2018.

Business segments
Currently there are three business segments.

BD Medical
In certain places, BD Medical also offers consulting and analytics related services. BD Medical's Consulting services are primarily targeted at hospitals, healthcare systems and networks of healthcare providers.

BD Life Sciences
Business units include Biosciences and Integrated Diagnostic Solutions.

Offerings include preanalytical solutions for sample management; immunology research, including flow cytometry and multiomics tools; microbiology and molecular diagnostics; lab automation and informatics; and differentiated reagents and assays.

BD Interventional
BD Interventional specialties solutions promote positive clinical outcomes using minimally invasive and percutaneous techniques. 

Critical Care
Critical Care is dedicated to helping physicians deliver uncompromised care in the areas of Bowel Management, and Patient Temperature Management Systems.

Urology
BD is a leader in urology and continence care. We strive to improve the quality of patient healthcare with essential, cost efficient medical devices such as intermittent catheters, urinary sheaths and urological drainage systems that provide effective clinical outcomes.

Drainage
Our range of acute and chronic drainage catheters has been carefully selected to meet the demands of current clinical practice, with an emphasis on improving patient quality of life.

Peripheral Intervention
Millions of people worldwide are impacted by major diseases each year, which is why Peripheral Intervention has a long history of providing medical device innovations, proven to be reliable, that are truly making a difference in patients’ lives.

Surgical Solutions
BD offers a full portfolio of hernia repair mesh, biologic implants and fixation systems. These offerings complement innovative techniques for a wide range of hernia procedures.

Infection prevention
Healthcare-associated infections (HAIs) represent a large and growing problem for our healthcare system. BD is uniquely positioned to help hospitals improve safety and reduce cost through our systematic and targeted approach, which combines clinically proven products, HAI surveillance and continuing education to help clinicians reduce the risk of infection.

Biosurgery
Enhanced sealants and hemostatic products to complement surgical techniques across, thoracic, cardiovascular and other surgical specialties.

Environmental and social track record 
As of February 2010, BD was ranked 18th in the EPA Fortune 500 List of Green Power Purchasers. BD was also listed among the top 100 companies in Newsweek's 2009 Green Rankings ranking of the 500 largest American corporations based on environmental performance, policies, and reputation. BD placed third in the health care sector and 83rd overall. In addition, BD has been a component of the Dow Jones Sustainability World Index and the Dow Jones Sustainability North America Index for the four and five consecutive years, respectively.

Pfitzer et al. (2013) identify BD's development of a needleless injection system as an example of leading businesses' role in creating shared value.

Controversies

2004 Anti-competitive practices
In 2004, BD agreed to pay out US$100 million to settle allegations from competitor Retractable Technologies that it had engaged in anti-competitive behavior to prevent the distribution of Retractable's syringes, which are designed to prevent needlestick injury. The lawsuit touched off a series of legal conflicts between the companies. Retractable would accuse BD of patent infringement after BD released a retractable needle of its own. Later Retractable would claim BD was falsely advertising its own brand of retractable needle as the “world’s sharpest needle”.

2007 Discardit II incident in Poland
In mid-2007, the firm's Discardit II series of syringes numbered 0607186 was withdrawn from hospitals and other medical services around Poland, about half a year after the discovery of remains of dark dust in some syringes, which were alleged to have been from this series. The newspaper Dziennik Online claimed that other series such as 06022444, 0603266, and 0607297 were also suspected of being contaminated.  BD recalled and tested the syringes in question, and revealed sterile particulates in 0.013 percent of the products.

2010 Q-Syte Luer and IV Catheter partial recall
In February 2010 BD announced a voluntary product recall of certain lots of BD Q-Syte Luer Access Devices and BD Nexiva Closed IV Catheter Systems. BD stated that the use of the affected devices may cause an air embolism or leakage of blood and/or therapy, which may result in serious injury or death. The approximately 2.8 million BD Q-Syte and 2.9 million BD Nexiva units containing 5 million BD Q-Syte devices that were recalled were distributed in the United States, Asia, Canada, Europe, Mexico, the Middle East, South Africa, and South America. The recall was initiated on Oct. 28, 2009 after BD received complaints of problems due to air entry through a part of the device. BD stated that the cause of the problem was manufacturing deviation and claimed that it corrected the problem. BD announced that it notified customers about the recall by letter and has been working with the U.S. Food and Drug Administration and worldwide health agencies to coordinate recall activities.

2016 Health and safety issues 
In April 2016, the Occupational Safety and Health Administration fined BD US$112,700 for safety violations. They found repeat and serious violations of health and safety law that had resulted in two employees having partial finger amputations.

2021 IV Administration Sets 
In March 2021 BD announced a recall of infusion sets for CC, GP, VP, GW/GW800, SE, and IVAC 590 Alaris Pumps and gravity infusion sets and connectors following the news that a supplier falsified sterilisation documents going back ten years.

See also

 Becton, Dickinson and Company headquarters
 List of biotech and pharmaceutical companies in the New York metropolitan area

References

External links

 
Companies listed on the New York Stock Exchange
Medical technology companies of the United States
Companies based in Bergen County, New Jersey
1897 establishments in New Jersey
Health care companies established in 1897
Franklin Lakes, New Jersey
Life sciences industry
Technology companies established in 1897
Health care companies based in New Jersey
American companies established in 1897